Superscape was a British developer and publisher of mobile games. The company has developed several mobile games, licensed from such companies as 20th Century Fox, Universal Pictures, Sony Pictures and Global Wireless entertainment. Superscape evolved from Incentive Software, a publisher of home computer games in the 1980s and 1990s.

Superscape Group plc was listed on the London Stock Exchange (LSE: SPS), and had offices in Hook, Hampshire (UK), San Clemente, California (USA) and Moscow (Russia) until being purchased by Glu Mobile UK in early 2008.

Games 
 Alien vs. Predator
 Alien vs. Predator 2 2D: Requiem
 Alien vs. Predator 3D
 Capone Casino 3D
 Do3D
 Fight Club
 Fight Club 3D
 Kingdom Hearts VCAST
 Lego Creator
 Lego Creator: Harry Potter
 Lego Creator: Knights' Kingdom
 Scuba Solitaire 3D
 The Elder Scrolls IV: Oblivion 
 Top Spin 2

References

Video game companies established in 1983
Mobile game companies
Defunct video game companies of the United Kingdom
Video game development companies
2008 mergers and acquisitions
Companies based in Hampshire